The Pittsburgh crime family, also known as the LaRocca crime family or Pittsburgh Mafia, is an Italian American Mafia crime family based in Pittsburgh, Pennsylvania. The LaRocca family is one of the original 26 mafia families in United States. In 2021, the boss Thomas "Sonny" Ciancutti died, he was also the last known made member of the family.

History

Prohibition era bosses

In the city of Pittsburgh the Italian Mafia was divided into two ethnic factions the "Sicilian's" and the "Neapolitan's". Territory within the city was also divided as the Sicilian's controlled the North and South sides, while the Neapolitan's controlled the East End. 

The earliest known Pittsburgh Sicilian Mafia boss was Salvatore "Banana King" Catanzaro, who during the early 1900s, operated wholesale produce firm in downtown Pittsburgh. Catanzaro worked alongside a network of Sicilian Mafia bosses in Western Pennsylvania. In 1914, Catanzaro was stabbed and stepped down as boss, he later died on February 17, 1916. This allowed Catanzaro's protege Gregorio Conti to assume control of his Sicilian Hill District Mafia family. As the new boss Gregorio Conti waged a war against the Neapolitan Camorra factions and by 1917, he won as the Neapolitan Camorra factions surrender and disbanded joining the Sicilian Mafia network. 

In 1919, the United States government passed the Eighteenth Amendment declaring the production, transportation and sale of intoxicating liquors illegal. Months later Congress passed the Volstead Act declaring that liquor, wine and beer all qualified as intoxicating liquors and were therefore prohibited. On September 24, 1919, Pittsburgh Mafia boss Gregorio Conti was shot and murdered. After Conti's death, his nephew Peppino Cusumano, led the Pittsburgh Mafia group, but worked in the shadow of Salvatore Calderone, who became the most powerful boss in the Western Pennsylvania's Mafia network. Calderone controlled the Mafia Network from  Apollo a town north of Pittsburgh. On January 17, 1920, Prohibition began in the United States, banning all production, importation, transportation and sale of alcoholic beverages.

Prohibition presented a very lucrative opportunity for both Mafia factions, as they began bootlegging, the illegal making, selling and transporting of alcohol. As bootlegging operations expanded throughout America violence erupted as criminals fought for dominance. Within the city of Pittsburgh, the Italian neighborhoods of Larimer, Homewood, the Hill District and Downtown became battle grounds as Mafia factions fought for territorial control of bootlegging rackets. In the suburbs of Pittsburgh, the Mafia factions fought for control of New Kensington, Arnold, Wilkinsburg, McKees Rocks, Wilmerding and Braddock. It was recorded that between 1926 to 1933, there were over 200 murders in Allegheny County.

By 1925, Stefano Monastero, became the new boss of the Pittsburgh Mafia family, as Salvatore Calderone stepped down and retired. Monastero, controlled a large organization of bootlegging supplies throughout several warehouses on the North side of Pittsburgh. During Monastero's reign he was suspected of ordering the bombings of rival bootleggers facilities and for ordering the murder of his competitor Luigi "Big Gorilla" Lamendola in May 1927. Monastero and his brother Sam Monastero were murdered on August 6, 1929 in front of St. John's hospital. Pittsburgh Police suspected that Joe "the Ghost" Pangallo, was responsible for ordering Monastero's murder, but were unable to prove it.

After Monastero's murder Giuseppe Siragusa became the new boss of the Pittsburgh family. Siragusa emigrated in 1910, from Sicily to Brooklyn and later to Pittsburgh, where he manufactured and traded in illegal alcohol in Allegheny County. He became known as the "Yeast Baron", after becoming one of the largest supplier of yeast to illegal beermakers in the area. Siragusa maintained close alliance to the Castellammarese Clan in New York City and paid tribute to Salvatore Maranzano. On September 13, 1931, Siragusa was murdered in his Squirrel Hill home, just days after Salvatore Maranzano was murdered.

Bazzano against the Volpe brothers
After the murder of Siragusa, the family came under the control of John Bazzano. The new boss Bazzano had immigrated to the United States from Calabria in the 1890s and built a bootlegging empire selling yeast and sugar to home breweries and thereby allowing them to manufacture illegal beer. Bazzano was a protégé of early Pittsburgh mobster Nicola Gentile and learned to keep a low profile. He owned a coffee shop in the Middle Hill and a mansion in Mt. Lebanon a neighborhood outside of Pittsburgh. Bazzano formed an alliance with the eight Volpe brothers, the leaders of the "Neapolitan faction" who controlled illegal rackets throughout the Turtle Creek Valley and Wilmerding.

Bazzano became aggravated when the Volpe brothers began expanding into East Liberty and the North Side. On July 29, 1932, Bazzano sent a hit team to murder the Volpe brothers, the hit team murdered three of the Volpe brothers. Two of the surviving Volpe brothers went to the "Commission" in New York, and it was decided Bazzano would be held responsible for his unsanctioned hit. On August 8, 1932, Bazzano's body was found in Red Hook, Brooklyn. He had been stabbed and strangled to death.

Vincenzo Capizzi became the new boss after Bazzano's murder, but he eventually resigned in 1937, and was replaced by Frank Amato. Amato began expanding his influence over the gambling rackets in and around Allegheny County, and formed a strong alliance with the Genovese family in New York City, who represented Pittsburgh at meetings of the eastern Commission. Amato ruled until 1956, when he became ill of a kidney ailment and resigned becoming underboss.

The reign of LaRocca
In 1956, Sebastian "Big John" LaRocca became the boss of the Pittsburgh family and reigned as boss for nearly thirty years. LaRocca was born in 1901, in Sicily and moved to the United States in 1910, he later moved in 1933, with his wife to Pittsburgh. He started a business selling beer equipment and concrete blocks in Oakland. LaRocca later gained control of multiple illegal rackets and was convicted on several occasions for larceny, receiving stolen property and operating an illegal lottery. In 1953, Immigration and Naturalization Service tried to use LaRocca's criminal record to deport him but several prominent figures testified on his behalf during the hearings and he was able to remain in the country until his death in 1984.

As boss of Pittsburgh, LaRocca attended the 1957, Apalachin Meeting along with his capos Gabriel "Kelly" Mannarino and Michael James Genovese. When the Police raided the Apalachin meeting LaRocca was able to escape the federal authorities but Mannarino and Genovese were unsuccessful and were arrested. LaRocca and capo Mannarino became partners with Tampa crime family boss Santo Trafficante, Jr. in the Sans Souci hotel-casino in Havana, Cuba. In 1959, Fidel Castro took control of Cuba and forced out all the mobsters in the country. Through bribery LaRocca became a powerful Mafia boss by controlling politicians, police officers and other officials in the Pittsburgh area. His family also maintained control of labor unions through Local 1058. LaRocca's influence also grew through close ties to Gambino crime family boss Carlo Gambino, Bufalino crime family boss Russell Bufalino, Philadelphia crime family boss Angelo Bruno and Kansas City crime family boss Nick Civella. In the 1960s, LaRocca's family started a conflict with the Cleveland crime family when they expanded into Youngstown, Ohio. In 1964, LaRocca supported Frank Valenti's takeover of the Rochester crime family from Jake Russo.

In the early 1980s, the family consisted of Boss Sebastian LaRocca, Underboss Joseph Pecora, Consigliere Michael Genovese and caporegimes John Bazzano Jr., Antonio Ripepi and Joseph Regino. LaRocca died on December 3, 1984.

Genovese and Porter
Michael Genovese became the new boss of the Pittsburgh crime family, with the death of LaRocca. He started his criminal career by controlling the numbers racket in East Liberty under LaRocca and eventually became a capo operating from Gibsonia, Pennsylvania. Genovese had spent years closely working with then Boss Sebastian John LaRocca, powerful Pittsburgh mobsters Gabriel "Kelly" Mannarino and Joseph Pecora. His reputation and power had increased over the years allowing him to be successfully accepted as the family's new boss. Genovese pursued members of the Pittsburgh family to create a large illegal drug trafficking network. The drug trafficking activities led to increased law enforcement surveillance and investigations. On March 3, 1987 longtime Underboss and West Virginia gambling leader Joseph N. "Jo Jo" Pecora died. After Pecora's death Genovese promoted Charles "Chucky" Porter to Underboss of the family. According to the 1989 crime report by the Pennsylvania Crime Commission the Pittsburgh family was in decline because the family was not accepting new members and the leadership was continuing to grow older.

In the late 1980s, the FBI increased its investigation into Pittsburgh's top cocaine traffickers, Charles "Chucky" Porter and Louis Raucci, Sr. In March 1990, an indictment charged Charles "Chucky" Porter and Louis F. Raucci Sr., along with seven associates, on charges of drug distribution, extortion, conspiracy to commit murder, robbery, gambling and racketeering. The Pennsylvania Crime Commission considered Porter to be Genovese's "right-hand man," while Raucci was said to "sit on the left side" of the boss. Both Porter and Louis F. Raucci were convicted numerous charges of drug distribution, extortion and racketeering. The family's Underboss Charles Porter decided to cooperate with the government leading the conviction of many top members and associates of the Pittsburgh family. By 1992, there was only a few members and associates operating in western Pennsylvania and eastern Ohio. The Pittsburgh family's main source of income was illegal sports and numbers gambling. In 1996, former capo Louis Raucci, Sr. died in prison. Genovese's former underboss Charles Porter was released from prison in 2000 after his 28 year sentence was halved for helping the FBI investigate mob operations from New York, New Jersey, Florida and California, including narcotics operations in Pittsburgh. On October 31, 2006, boss Michael Genovese died after of years of fighting with bladder cancer and heart disease. John Bazzano Jr. took over as boss, until his death on July 28, 2008.

Current status
In 2008, Thomas "Sonny" Ciancutti became boss of the Pittsburgh family. Ciancutti himself was one of the few remaining made members operating in Pittsburgh, after the late 1990s, when many members were imprisoned and many over the years many of the older members passed away. According to the FBI, Ciancutti controlled a large illegal gambling ring with top bookmakers Robert Iannelli, John "Duffy" Conley, Jeff Risha and Ronnie "Porky" Melocchi, whom all paid him protection.

On September 5, 2013 "Operation Pork Chop" concluded charging associate Ronald “Porky” Melocchi and others with bookmaking and illegal gambling. In 2013, retired FBI special agent Roger Greenbank spoke about the Pittsburgh family and said "There's no real structure anymore. There's no real family." In 2016, Sonny Ciancutti’s most trusted associate Jeff Risha died of cancer. Ciancutti continued to remain low profile using associates to run the Pittsburgh's local bookmaking and illegal gambling operations. In 2019, Robert Iannelli, a longtime Pittsburgh area sports gambling and bookmaker, was arrested along with his son and others.

On July 8, 2021, Pittsburgh family boss Thomas "Sonny" Ciancutti died. Ciancutti was the last known made member in the Pittsburgh family.

Historical leadership

Boss (official and acting)
c.1886–1914 – Salvatore "Banana King" Catanzaro – stepped down, died on February 17, 1916
c.1915–1919 – Gregorio Conti – murdered on September 24, 1919
1919–1925 – Salvatore Calderone – retired
1925–1929 – Stefano Monastero – murdered on August 6, 1929
1929–1931 – Giuseppe "Yeast Baron" Siragusa – murdered on September 13, 1931
1931–1932 – John Bazzano – found dead on August 8, 1932, in Red Hook, Brooklyn
1932–1937 – Vincenzo Capizzi – retired to Italy
1937–1956 – Frank Amato – stepped down, becoming underboss
1956–1984 – Sebastian "Big John" LaRocca – died on December 3, 1984<ref name="Local 1058">[http://www.ipsn.org/pittsburgh/t2000-08t-03-9-2001.htm Laborers local 1058 (Pittsburgh) order and Memorandum imposing supervision in lieu of trusteesh]  Docket No. 00-08T. Decided March 9, 2001</ref>Ruling Panel 1973–1978 – Michael J. Genovese, Gabriel "Kelly" Mannarino and Antonio RipepiRuling Panel 1978–1980 – Michael J. Genovese, Gabriel "Kelly" Mannarino (died July 11, 1980) and Joseph N. "Jo Jo" Pecora (imprisoned 1979)Acting 1980–1984 – Michael Genovese – promoted to boss
1984–2006 – Michael James Genovese – died on October 31, 2006
2006–2008 – John Bazzano Jr. – died on July 28, 2008Ove, Torsten. Obituary: John Bazzano Jr./Member of the dwindling Pittsburgh mob June 28, 1927 – July 25, 2008. July 29, 2008. Pittsburgh Post-Gazette.
2008–2021 – Thomas "Sonny" Ciancutti – died on July 8, 2021

Underboss
c.1915–1919 – Peppino Cusumano – nephew to boss Gregorio Conti
1925–1929 – Salvatore "Sam" Monastero – brother to boss Stefano Monastero
1937–1956 – Sebastian "Big John" LaRocca – became boss
1956–1962 – Frank Amato – became consigliere, died 1973
1962–1969 – Gabriel "Kelly" Mannarino – stepped down after indictment; died July 11, 1980
1969–1987 – Joseph N. "Jo Jo" Pecora – imprisoned 1979–1983, died 1987
1987–1990 – Charles "Chucky" Porter – arrested April 1990; convicted in 1990, sentenced to 28 years, defected to the government
1990–2006 – John Bazzano Jr. – became boss in 2006
2006–2008 – Thomas "Sonny" Ciancutti – became boss

Consigliere
1931–1937 – Nicola Gentile
1962–1973 – Frank Amato – died 1973
1973–1980 – Charles "Murgie" Imburgia – stepped down
1980–1984 – Michael James Genovese – promoted to boss
1984–2002 – Charles "Murgie" Imburgia – died
2002–2006 – Thomas "Sonny" Ciancutti – became underboss

Current made members
The last known made member was boss Thomas "Sonny" Ciancutti who died on July 8, 2021.

Current associates
Southwestern gambling ring
Robert "Bobby I" Iannelli – is an associate to the Pittsburgh family and the leader of the "Southwestern gambling ring" who controls illegal sports gambling and numbers lottery in Allegheny and Westmoreland Counties from his Chub's Place restaurant in North Park. Iannelli was fined by Pittsburgh police in 1959 with football pool sheets. Iannelli started his criminal career under Tony Grosso a Pittsburgh gambling boss."Iannelli gambling organization cracked; arrests today."  June 25, 1990. PRNewswire. (Retrieved at High Beam Research on December 3, 2010) After Grosso was imprisoned Iannelli took over the illegal gambling in Western Pennsylvania on behalf of the LaRocca crime family and mafia don Michael Genovese. Iannelli partnered with the Williams brother and controlled Grosso's illegal lottery, he also aligned with Pittsburgh capos Anthony "Wango" Capizzi and Frank "Sonny" Amato, Jr. His son Rodney "Rusty" Iannelli joined him in the criminal gambling rackets. In 2019, Iannelli was arrested and charged along with his son Rodney Iannelli and twelve others with operating an illegal gambling operation. In September 2020 Iannelli and his son pleaded guilty, they paid fines of $300,000 and sentenced to 10 years in prison but were given probation and will not have to spend time in prison.
Rodney Elia "Rusty" Iannelli –  the son of "high ranking" associate Robert Iannelli. Rodney was arrested in 1991 on illegal gambling from Chub's Place. He was charged in the 2013 with illegal gambling along with Pittsburgh mob figures Ron "Porky" Melocchi and Jeff "Biscuit" Risha. In 2019, Iannelli was arrested and charged along with his father Robert Iannelli and twelve others with operating an illegal gambling operation. In September 2020 Iannelli and his father pleaded guilty and were sentenced to 10 years in prison but were given probation and will not have to spend time in prison.

James Roger Martorella
John James Harkins
Harry Ronald Stetson
Floyd A. Panella
Arden Keith Metcalfe
Victor Marchitello
Frank Joseph Pasquino
Vincent M. Rapneth
Levi Wilson Helsel

McKeesport gambling ring
Ronald "Porky" Melocchi – is an associate of the Pittsburgh family and leader of the "McKeesport gambling ring". In 2013, Melocchi was indicted along with Jeffery Risha, Rodney Iannelli and fourteen others on illegal gambling charges. Melocchi was accused of run the illegal gambling operation from his defunct business the Coffee Pot in McKeesport. The indictment also charged Melocchi with selling illegal gambling machines and with controlling illegal gambling activity of lotteries and bookmaking throughout Monongahela Valley and McKeesport area. In the indictment Melocchi was accused of and boasted that he had law enforcement and local city council members in his pocket. The indictment alleged that Melocchi bought "Back Alley Vending", a Glassport business from Primo Mollica, a Pittsburgh Mafia associate who controlled illegal gambling in Mon Valley until he died in 2001. In June 2015, Melocchi was sentenced to a decade of probation.
Kirk "K-Prime" Mollica – the son of former "high ranking" associate Primo Mollica, who once controlled gambling throughout Glassport, McKeesport, and the surrounding areas. Before his father Primo Mollica died in 2001, he had sold his "Back Alley Vending", a Glassport vending business to Ronald Melocchi. In 2013, Mollica was indicted along with Ronald Melocchi, Rodney Iannelli, Jeffrey Risha and fourteen others on illegal gambling charges. The indictment list Kirk's "M&M Coffee Shop" in Glassport associated with Melocchi's "Back Alley Vending".

Mark Holtzman
Ronald Preset
Arthur Pero
James Cerqua
Robert H. Bogesdorfer
Eugene T. Kowalski
Timothy John Minkus

Fayette and Allegheny gambling ring
Ralph "Big Head" Maselli – is an associate of Pittsburgh family. In October 2000, Maselli along with Pittsburgh made member Thomas Ciancutti, associate Jeffery Risha, his wife Karen Maselli and ten other associates were charged with illegal gambling in Fayette County. It was revealed in court that Maselli and Jeffery Risha were Thomas Ciancutti's top lieutenants who operated from Pittsburgh before moving into the "New Beacon Club" in Bloomfield. The courts described Maselli as Ciancutti's lieutenant controlling sports betting and numbers rackets throughout Allegheny County and also was involved in the placement of video poker machines.

Louis Cutone Jr.
Dave Borkovich
Mark Borkovich
Joseph Scarillo
Albert Tabasco
Thomas Thornton
Thomas Ferris
Mark Anthony Howard
James Michael John

Duffy gambling ring
John Francis "Duffy" Conley Jr. – a Pittsburgh family associate who operates an illegal video poker machine ring in Pittsburgh area. Conley owned two vending machine companies "Three River Coin Co." and "Duffy Vending" and controlled illegal gambling Allegheny County. Conley was associated with both Pittsburg family associates Ralph Maselli and John Adams. In 2006, Conley was arrested for running illegal gambling operations. The federal investigation never proved that Conley paid the Pittsburgh mob for protection, but the Pennsylvania Crime Commission claimed Conley received video poker machines from a company aligned with New Jersey's Lucchese and DeCavalcante organized crime families. In November 2006, Conley and Chris Hankish were charged in a gambling ring. Conley was release from prison in July 2009. In 2010, Conley and William Curtin opened a legal online gambling website.
William Curtin – is Conley's number two man in the gambling ring. In 2010, Curtin and John Conley opened a legal online gambling website.
Michael "Mickey" Flynn Jr. – an associate of Conley's. He pleaded guilty November 1, 2006 to gambling conspiracy charges in connection with Conley's illegal gambling operation. Flynn is the owner of the Union Grill in Washington, and was convicted on state gambling charges in 2004.

Penn Hills gambling machine ring
Mauro P. Matone – a Pittsburgh associate. Matone worked closely with Eugene Gesuale and involved in the narcotics distribution."Drug Sentence". Pittsburgh Post-Gazette. May 22, 1993. (pg. B4) He was released from prison on February 22, 1996. In March 2003, Matone was arrested along with thirteen others for operating illegal video gambling machines in Penn Hills.
Joseph P. Scolieri Sr. – a Pittsburgh associate involved in sports gambling and bookmaking in the Penn Hills area.

Other associates
John V. "Johnny A" Adams Jr. – a Pittsburgh associate. Adams controls a large gambling operations in the Pittsburgh area and is a close associate of John Conley Jr. and Ralph Maselli.
Salvatore A. "Sonny" Williams – a Pittsburgh associate. His father controlled a large Pittsburgh gambling ring. Williams is a close associate of John Conley Jr. Williams was also a close associate of Paul Hankish.
Anthony Murgie – a Pittsburgh associate. He is the nephew of Charles Imburgia and was a close associate of Charles Porter and Michael Genovese. Murgie was involved in illegal gambling.
Gerald D. Sabatini – a Pittsburgh associate. Sabatini's brothers John V. and Robert J. were associates of the Pittsburgh family and involved in narcotics and illegal gambling operations. Sabatini's is a close associate of Thomas Ciancutti.
James "Brad" LaRocca – a Pittsburgh associate involved in bid rigging. 
Manuel Xenakis – a Pittsburgh associate of Thomas Ciancutti with known involvement in sports and numbers bookmaking.
Reginald "Nico" Demelio – a Pittsburgh associate involved in bid rigging and extortion.https://img1.wsimg.com/blobby/go/6d947f61-a75c-4b56-a3d6-c0250e46969c/downloads/77%20Bid%20Rigging%20Pittsburgh%20foia.pdf?ver=1654582487179 
Jon Edward Scalzitti – a Pittsburgh associate. In 2002, Scalzitti was found guilty of a drug distribution network from Florida to Pittsburgh.
Joseph LaQuatra – a Pittsburgh associate.
Frank Rosa – a Pittsburgh associate.
Gerald Pecora Jr. – a Pittsburgh associate and former Local 1058 Union president.Felix "Phil" Pitzerell– a Pittsburgh associate involved in gambling, narcotics and stolen goods.Alfred F. Corbo – a Pittsburgh associate overseeing large scale gambling operations in Wheeling, WV and Altoona, PA.Frank Unis Jr. – a Pittsburgh associate with ties to the Gambino LCN family in New York. Unis was charged by federal authorities with running a $500,000 per week bookmaking operation.

Former membersFrank Amato – a former boss. Amato controlled rackets in New Kensington and West Virginia he expanded the crime family's territory throughout Allegheny County. He stepped down as boss becoming  underboss to LaRocca. He died in 1973.Sebastian "John" LaRocca – a former boss. Under LaRocca's leadership the crime family became a powerful force in Pittsburgh's labor unions. He established rackets in Ohio, while sharing some of the illegal income with the Cleveland crime family. LaRocca also formed an agreement with Tampa crime family boss Santo Trafficante operating casinos in Havana, Cuba. In 1957, LaRocca attended the Apalachin conference with Michael James Genovese and Gabriel "Kelly" Mannarino. He died on December 3, 1984.Michael James Genovese – a former boss. Under Genovese's leadership the crime family became involved drug distribution in the Midwest and Northeast. His crime family also took control over rackets in Ohio after the Cleveland crime family members were imprisoned. Genovese also had members attempt to infiltrate an Indian casino near San Diego. His crime family also tried to take control of the McKees Rocks gambling rackets. After the defection of his underboss Charles Porter and capo Lenny Strollo in the 1990s, Genovese's family lost power. He stayed boss until his death in 2006 at the age of 87.Thomas "Sonny" Ciancutti – a former boss. Ciancutti took over Gabriel "Kelly" Mannarino's New Kensington gambling rackets. In October 2000, Ciancutti along with his wife Sylvia Thorpe Ciancutti, his two close associates Jeffrey Risha and Ralph Maselli and eleven other associates were arrested and charged with running a gambling network that spanned Westmoreland, Allegheny and Fayette counties. Ciancutti's two lieutenants in the operation were Jeffrey Risha, who controlled sport betting and numbers rackets in Fayette County, Ralph Maselli who ran the Allegheny County gambling operations and also was involved in the placement of video poker machines. In 2002, Ciancutti was given probation for controlling gambling operations in Allegheny and Fayette counties.Ove, Torsten. Obituary: Frank D. Amato Jr./ Although identified as Mafia figure, he was never charged with crime. November 7, 2003. Pittsburgh Post-Gazette On July 8, 2021 Ciancutti died.John Bazzano Jr. – a former boss. Bazzano's father John, Sr. was boss of the Pittsburgh family before being murdered in 1932. During the 1950s, he joined his father-in-law Antonio Ripepi's crew operating gambling rackets in the Monongahela Valley. Bazzano was released from prison in 1981 and was promoted to capo controlling Kelly Mannarino's old crew. Bazzano operated from McMurray, Pennsylvania. He later became underboss to Genovese and became boss in 2006. On July 28, 2008, Bazzano, Jr. died.Joseph N. "Jo Jo" Pecora – a former underboss who controlled gambling rackets from Chester and throughout West Virginia. In 1979, Pecora as convicted of racketeering and illegal gambling and was sentenced to five years in prison. On March 3, 1987 Pecora died of heart disease in Florida.Gabriel "Kelly" Mannarino – former caporegime who controlled the New Kensington rackets. Mannarino had ties to the Bufalino family. In 1969, he was indicted along with boss Sebastian John LaRocca for conspiring on a loan kickback scheme from the teamsters Central States Pension Fund, but they were both latter acquitted. Mannarino controlled Westmoreland County and Youngstown, Ohio, which were later inherited by Thomas Ciancutti and Joseph Naples. He died on July 11, 1980, from cancer.Antonio Ripepi – a former capo who controlled Monongahela Valley gambling, with his son-in-law John Bazzano, Jr.; he died in 2000.Pasquale "Pat" Ferruccio – a former capo who operated in Canton-Stark County, Ohio area and the Akron-Summit County, Ohio area while paying tribute to the Cleveland family. In 1991, Ferruccio was imprisoned. He died in 2006.Frank "Sonny" Amato Jr. – a former soldier who operated in East Pittsburgh, Braddock, Turtle Creek and North Versailles.Frank Valenti – a former soldier; in the early 1960s he took over the Rochester family.Louis Raucci Sr. – a former soldier, he took over Joseph Sica's Penn Hills rackets. In 1990 he was imprisoned, and he died in 1995.Anthony "Wango" Capizzi – a former soldier who operated in Las Vegas with the Bufalino family. He died in 2007.Henry A. "Zebo" Zottola – a former soldier who worked with Charles Porter controlling loansharking and gambling in Eastern Allegheny County. During the 1970s Zottola worked with underboss Joseph Pecora controlling his gambling and illegal rackets when Percora was imprisoned. Zottola controlled Pittsburgh's family interest in Youngstown, Ohio. He died in 1998.Geno "Eugene" Chiarelli – a former soldier.United States v. Geno Chiarelli. US Court of Appeals, Third Circuit. – 898 F.2d 373. (Decided March 14, 1990) He was released from prison in 2008. Chiarelli died on June 14, 2012.Charles "Murgie" Imburgia– former consigliere. Imburgia began his criminal career in Pittsburgh before moving to Ohio and controlling Trumbull County. His nephew Anthony Murgie became an associate to the Pittsburgh family. Imburgia's son-in-law Frank Nannicola continued to operate a gambling-equipment business based in Youngstown, Ohio.John "Jack" Verilla – controlled several gambling operations with ties to the LaRocca family. He died in prison while serving a life sentence for murder.Sam Mannarino – former made member and brother to Gabriel "Kelly" Mannarino. He helped his brother control gambling activities in New Kensington and the northern part of Westmoreland County. In 1958, Mannarino was forced into retirement because of law enforcement surveillance and declining health. During the 1960s, Mannarino informal chats with the FBI and admitted to the FBI that he was a member of "La Cosa Nostra" and that Pittsburgh crime family boss John LaRocca had sponsored him and his brother into the organization. Mannarino never testified against any of his former criminal associates, and he never revealed anything that would put him in the category of a full-fledged informant. In June 1967, Mannarino died.Joseph Sica – a former soldier who controlled rackets in Penn Hills. In 1978, Sica was convicted of extortion. He retired in the 1980s and died in 1991.

Former associatesJeffrey "The Biscuit" Risha – is an associate of Pittsburgh family. Risha was considered Thomas Ciancutti's top lieutenant and who controlled sports betting and video poker gambling. In October 2000, Risha along with Pittsburgh made member Thomas Ciancutti, associate Ralph Maselli and eleven other associates were charged with illegal gambling in Fayette County. It was revealed in court that Risha and Ralph Maselli were Ciancutti's top lieutenants who operated from Pittsburgh before moving into the "New Beacon Club" in Bloomfield. The courts described Risha as Ciancutti's top lieutenant controlling sports betting and numbers rackets throughout Fayette County and was responsible for ensuring the betting was profitable. In 2013, Risha was charged with Ronald Melocchi, Rodney Iannelli and others for illegal gambling. Risha died in 2016.Eugene "Nick the Blade" Gesuale – was released from prison in November 2015 after serving 28 years related to drug trafficking. During the 1970s and mid-1980s Gesuale was a narcotics trafficker and enforcer for Charles Porter and Penn Hills capo Louie Raucci. Gesuale became the Pittsburgh Mafia's liaison between the Mafia family and Pagans motorcycle club boss Daniel "Danny the Deacon" Zwibel. He ran his marijuana and cocaine distribution network from East Liberty and Highland Park along with the Pittsburgh family and the Pagans motorcycle gang. Gesuale also was involved in bookmaking, loan sharking, extortion and ran a prostitution business in Manhattan's “Little Italy” section, with the apparent approval of New York City mob families. He was also a close mob associate of Pittsburgh family boss Michael Genovese. Gesuale became famously known from the movie Goodfellas and he was nicknamed the "Pittsburgh connection" after selling Lucchese mob associates Henry Hill cocaine. In 1985 an indictment charged Gesuale, his right hand John "Johnny Three Fingers" Leone and Pagans motorcycle gang boss Daniel Zwibel with drug trafficking. Gesuale died on July 29, 2016.John V. "Johnny Three Fingers" Leone – a Pittsburgh associate who was involved in narcotics trafficking. Leone was Eugene Gesuale's top lieutenant and a major player in the "Pittsburgh Connection" a drug trafficking operation along with Pagans motorcycle gang boss Daniel Zwibel with drug trafficking.Pennsylvania Crime Commission 1987 Report. Pennsylvania Attorney General's Office. (pg.118, 121) Leone died January 2, 2002.Frank P. Unis Jr. (March 16, 1954 – May 15, 2020) a former Pittsburgh associate who controlled illegal gambling in Aliquippa. He operates a large illegal gambling in Beaver County and was a close associate of Paul Hankish. In 1989, Unis Jr., was identified as the leader of a Aliquippa-based gambling operation. In September 1991, Unis Jr., pleaded guilty to illegal gambling charges in West Virginia, he and was later sentenced to 18 months in prison and three years of probation. In 1993, Unis Jr., received a 16 year probation sentence after pleading guilty in Beaver County Court to an illegal gambling charge. On October 21, 2008, Unis Jr. and Duane Cope were charged with attempted homicide of a man in front of a gambling spot in Aliquippa. According to the Aliquippa police, Unis Jr. admitted too running an illegal gambling operation from 435 Franklin Ave. in Aliquippa. The police discovered the gambling location after Thomas “Snooky” Jeter Jr. was shot and he told the police that Unis Jr. was the shooter. On May 15, 2020 Unis died in his home.Anthony "Rocky" LaRocca – a former associate and member of the Pagan's Motorcycle Club. LaRocca was the nephew to former Pittsburgh boss Sebastian "John" LaRocca. In 1973, LaRocca and a member of the Pagans were charged with assaulting an ATF agent, conspiracy to distribute a controlled substance, possession of a non-registered silencer, and using a firearm during the commission of a felony. In 1975, LaRocca was sentenced to 30 years in prison, after an appeal his sentenced was reduced to 10 years in prison. After his was released from prison in 1982, LaRocca created a cocaine distribution network operating in Western Pennsylvania with Francis "Rick" Ferri and others. In 1987, LaRocca and Ferri were found guilty, and both men were sentenced to life in prison for the 1982 murder of John Heatherington. LaRocca was also charged with cocaine trafficking and received an additional sentenced to 20 years in prison. While in prison LaRocca continued to control his cocaine distribution network.Primo Victor Mollica – a former "high ranking" associate who once controlled gambling throughout Glassport, McKeesport, and the surrounding areas.https://www.ojp.gov/pdffiles1/Digitization/133208NCJRS.pdf  On February 19, 1981, Mollica was charged by Pennsylvania authorities with operation of a lottery, bookmaking, and conspiracy. In July 1983, Mollica was arrested and charged along with Augustine Ferrone, Andrew Kurta, Sidney Mendlowitz, Robert Weitz and Donna Stagno with running a multimillion dollar bookmaking ring out of Caesars Boardwalk Regency Hotel-Casino in Atlantic City, New Jersey. Mollica died on September 19, 2001.Anthony "Ninny the Torch" Lagattuta - former mob enforcer, reputed hit man and arsonist.Adolpho "Junior" Williams – Williams was involved in bookmaking, loan sharking and narcotics distribution. Michael James Genovese provided Williams muscle for the crew’s collections and enforcement wing in Robert (Bobby I) Iannelli and Paul (Paulie No Legs) Hankish, a Pittsburgh mob gambling chief stationed in West Virginia. Williams was on A&E's reality TV show Godfather of Pittsburgh. He held mafia control of McKees Rocks from the mid-1980s to early 2000s. Williams' territory spanned from the East End to the Hill District and McKees Rocks. On March 11, 2003, Williams plead guilty to a $2.5 million dollar gambling operation. He died March 30, 2016

Former factions
Youngstown faction
The Pittsburgh family used associates to control the illegal gambling and loansharking operations in Youngstown, Ohio and throughout the Mahoning Valley. During the early 1970s the faction gained control of the gambling rackets in Youngstown and shared some of the profits with the Cleveland crime family.

1960s–1988 – James "Jimmy" Prato – died 1988
1988–1991 – Joseph "Joey" Naples – protégé of Prato, he was murdered in 1991
1991–1999 – Lenine "Lenny" Strollo – nephew of Prato, imprisoned and defected to the government in 1999.

Wheeling faction
The Pittsburgh family used associates to control the illegal gambling and loansharking operations in Wheeling, West Virginia and the surrounding areas.

c.1930–1970 – William G. “Big Bill” Lias – born on July 14, 1900. After Prohibition ended Lias moved into illegal gambling and controlled casino-nightclubs in Wheeling. In 1945, Lias purchase Wheeling Down racetrack. In 1964, Lias rivaled with Paul Hankish and was suspected of ordering the car bombing of Hankish. The U.S. government tried to deport Lias to Greece but they failed to prove he was born outside of the United States. Lias died in 1970.
1970–1988 – Paul "No Legs" Hankish – a Pittsburgh family associate of Gabriel "Kelly" Mannarino, Michael Genovese, Charles Porter and Joseph Naples. On January 17, 1964 Hankish was a victim of a car bombing which resulted in the partial amputation of both his legs. It was suspected the car bombing was a result of Hankish trying to expand his gambling territory into William Lias territory. After William Lias died in 1970, Hankish took over Wheeling criminal operations with the support of the Pittsburgh family. Hankish was involved in diverse criminal activities, including gambling, prostitution, narcotics trafficking, extortion, fencing stolen goods, and loansharking. In July 1990, Hankish was sentenced to 33 years in prison.
1988–2008 – Christopher Paul Hankish – a Pittsburgh family associate operating from Wheeling, West Virginia. His father Paul Hankish was a powerful mobster. In 1990, Hankish was a codefendant along with Charles Porter and Louis F. Raucci Sr. Hankish pleaded guilty in 1991 to cocaine distribution and was sentenced to two years in federal prison. In November 2006, Hankish was charged along with his close associate John Conley Jr. on illegal gambling. Hankish died on September 19, 2008.

RivalsAnthony "Tony" Grosso – controlled gambling operations in the Pittsburgh area. The FBI never categorized Grosso as an organized crime member. Grosso was linked to Charles "Chucky" Porter, and Grosso had ties to the Pittsburgh political system allowing him to run his organization unscathed for many years and unconnected to organized crime. He was eventually arrested by law enforcement and he served significant jail time, ultimately dying while incarcerated. His organization has no members left operating in the Pittsburgh area today. Grosso's antics were so legendary that Hollywood loosely based the movie Lucky Numbers starring John Travolta on them.Dick Thornburgh. Where the Evidence Leads: An Autobiography, Revised and Updated. University of Pittsburgh Press, 2003. (pg. 44–53)

Government informants and witnessesCharles "Chucky" Porter – former underboss who became the highest-ranking member in the Pittsburgh family to cooperate with the government. He became a soldier in 1986. Porter was the right-hand man of boss Michael Genovese. He was sentenced to 28 years in prison in 1990 on charges of drug distribution, loansharking, extortion, conspiracy to commit murder, robbery, illegal gambling and racketeering. Porter confessed to the infiltration of a Native American casino near San Diego and according to former FBI agent Roger Greenbank, Porter prevented six Mob-related murders through his cooperation. He was released from prison in 2000. Porter died on October 11, 2016 at the age of 82.Lenine "Lenny" Strollo – (April 21, 1931 – May 19, 2021) – former caporegime of the Youngstown, Ohio faction before becoming a government witness. He began his criminal career in Pittsburgh before moving to Youngstown, Ohio and associating with Pasquale Ferruccio and Joseph Naples. In 1988, Strollo was indicted for controlling an illegal gambling operation in Mahoning County. In 1990, he pled guilty to RICO charges and was sentenced to 14 months in prison and was fined $20,000. In August 1991, Joey Naples the capo of the Youngstown faction was killed and Strollo took over the crew. In December 1997, Strollo was indicted and charged with the murder of Ernie Biondillo and the attempted murder of Paul Gains. Strollo agreed to cooperate with federal prosecutors and in 1999, he testified against three men for murdering Ernie Biondillo and for attempting to murder Mahoning County Prosecutor-elect Paul Gains in Christmas Eve of 1996. All three men received life sentences without the possibility of parole. In 2004, Strollo pleaded guilty to racketeering and tax charges and was sentenced to thirteen (13) years in prison. He was released from prison in 2012. Strollo died on May 19, 2021 at the age of 90.Joseph "Joey" Rosa – was an associate of the LaRocca family, who later testified on behalf of the federal government and provided information that led to the largest organized crime prosecution in Western Pennsylvania's history.Bobby Mancini – cooperated with Pennsylvania State Police in a probe into Adolpho "Junior" Williams mob crew and political and police corruption. Mancini was killed on October 24, 1988, shot in the back of the head at his dining room table.Phil Leonetti – Leonetti has testified in eight federal trials, plus three re-trials, and three state trials in prosecutions of the Pittsburgh La Cosa Nostra and the Patriarca, Genovese, Gambino/Gotti, Lucchese, Colombo and Bruno/Stanfa Families. His testimony has led to the convictions of more than 15 made members and 23 associates.

See also

Robert Duggan
Eugene CoonGeneral:'''
 Crime in Pennsylvania

Notes

References
Capeci, Jerry. The Complete Idiot's Guide to the Mafia. Indianapolis: Alpha Books, 2002. 
Devico, Peter J. The Mafia Made Easy: The Anatomy and Culture of La Cosa Nostra.
Porrello, Rick. To Kill the Irishman: The War That Crippled the Mafia. 2004
Ciancuiit, Thomas Little Chicago: A History of Organized Crime in New Kensington, Pennsylvania - Book by Dennis L. Marsili''

External links
American Gangland: LaRocca-Genovese Crime Family
Dieland: The Pittsburgh Family
Dieland: Youngstown Representatives
Pittsburgh Maifa

Organizations established in the 1910s
1910s establishments in Pennsylvania
Organizations based in Pittsburgh
Italian-American crime families
Gangs in Ohio
Gangs in Pennsylvania
Gangs in West Virginia
Italian-American culture in Pittsburgh
Crime in Pittsburgh